The manhwa Vagrant Soldier Ares features several characters.

Main characters

Ares
Ares is the main protagonist. He is 18 years old when the story begins. He is the bastard son of a nobleman named Kaiser. His birth name is Sebastion, but he lost his memories at the age of 6 after jumping off a cliff during a failed assassination instigated by his half brother, the legitimate heir to their father. Kiron, the famous Master Swordsman of Chronos, chanced upon him during the assassination attempt, rescued him, and took him on as an apprentice. After 6 years, Kirberos, the weapon collecting Red-Eyed Swordsman, tracked down the retired recluse Kiron and killed him to collect his sword. Ares lost his right eye to Kirberos during this fight and vowed vengeance. After killing Kirberos, Ares re-establishes the Temple mercenaries and becomes the commander. He, Baroona, and Douglas lead the mercenaries. Ares is last seen dancing with his girlfriend in a ball before the manhwa ends ...

Ares is lighthearted and friendly in normal situations. He is goofy, cracks jokes, and behaves as if he is simple-minded. For example, he joins the Temple Mercenaries because they provide meals for their members.

In battle, Ares is deadly. As expected of Kiron's apprentice, few can stand against his fighting ability. Throughout the course of his travels, Ares has either defeated or fought equally with various legendary characters from his universe. He fights with a sword, but he will eliminate weaker opponents with only kicks or elbow strikes. His swordplay and fighting style incorporate quick, hard strikes, and acrobatic maneuvers to both evade enemy attacks and enhance his own momentum. He makes good use of his environment: launching off walls, dropping chandeliers on enemies, taking swords from fallen soldiers if his own breaks. Temple Mercenaries gave him B-Rank status after his first skirmish. He is currently A-Rank although he calls himself A+. A year after he killed Mikael, Ares killed Kirberos and avenging his master.  He, Mikael, Baroona and Gogh belong to the Temple Mercenaries, 4th Regiment, 2nd Squadron, Troop 3.

Ares first appears in Chapter 1.

Mikael
See Mikael Graccio.

Baroona
Baroona is a run-away champion gladiator. The tattoo on his back indicates his status as a former slave of Daraak. He is 18 or 19 years old.

Baroona is the calm middle ground between the personalities of Ares and Mikael. That is, he is more sensible than Ares and more sane than Mikael. He has a kind-hearted and laid back personality.

Baroona fights with two daggers tied to the ends of a metal rope-the double dagger rope dart-a weapon given him by his former master and fellow gladiator (who also got him hooked on smokes). He became B-Rank after his first mission and is currently A-Rank. He, Ares, Mikael, and Gogh belong to the Temple Mercenaries, 4th Regiment, 2nd Squadron, Troop 3.

Baroona, alongside Robin and six other Temple Mercenaries, survived the assault when they were sent away on a mission to protect a rich family. While there, he developed a friendship with a young girl.

A year after Ares killed Mikael, Baroona joined the hunt for Kirberos with Ares. When they do encounter Kirberos, Baroona defends an unconscious Ares, the resulting battle breaking his knives. Eventually, him and Ares split the bounty money to reestablish the Temple Mercenaries, along with Douglas and Gogh.
  
Baroona first appears in Chapter 2.

Gogh
Also known as Gohu, Gohue, etc.

Gogh is an artist and a soldier who can't fight. He joined the mercenaries because he wanted to paint epic battles and believes the proper way to capture them is to experience the battles first hand.

Despite his cowardice, he shows courage and loyalty to his friends. Gogh has no fighting ability and rose to B-Rank by surviving enough battles by hiding, playing dead, or relying on the abilities of his friends. After the war with Mikael, he becomes a highly respected artist.  He, Ares, Mikael, and Baroona belong to the Temple Mercenaries, 4th Regiment, 2nd Squadron, Troop 3.

During the Isiris war, Gogh survived the attack on the Temple Mercenaries by hiding from them, which Mikael anticipated. Afterwards, he developed a crush on Jill (who's actually Sandra of the Death Knights), which he couldn't purse because Rikion killed her.

Gogh first appears in Chapter 4.

Emergency Food
Emergency Food is the name of the small black bird that hangs around with Ares. Ares was first annoyed by the bird's presence, but Gogh told him the bird could be used as emergency food. Since then the bird is usually seen perched on Ares' shoulder or helmet, occasionally Emergency Food rests on Gogh's shoulder too. When Ares is crucified by the Isiris Graccio soldiers, Emergency Food protects Ares from being eaten by the larger birds of prey.

Emergency Food first appears in Chapter 19.

Temple Mercenaries
Temple Mercenaries is the most respected soldiers-for-hire operation in Chronos.

Douglas
A mercenary from Marlan. He has a scar on his right cheek and blonde (or white) shaggy hair that covers his left eye. He confronts Ares because he wants to see which of them is a better fighter, but they have to end their fight early. They become friends soon after and he eventually joins Ares, Baroona, Robin, and Gogh's group.

Douglas is an intelligent and very strong fighter. Like Mikael and Ares, he is a swordsman, although not at their level. He is also smooth with the ladies, although he was once beaten by Helena for hitting on Ariadne, before finding out she was Ares' girlfriend.

One-Armed Jack
One-Armed Jack is an A-Rank soldier. He also has a scar across the bridge of his nose. He is a strong fighter whose ability forces Carnival to fight with both swords. In that battle, he tires and is rescued when Mikael resumes the fight in his stead.

One-Armed Jack, often referred to as One-Armed-Sunbae, always dreamed of running a bakery shop when he retired from the Temple Mercenaries.

One-Armed Sunbae died in the Daraak vs Chronos war, his last battle before he was going to retire, promising to Ares that he'd serve him bread. His death spurned Ares to fight even harder against Cygnus.

One-Armed Jack first appears in Chapter 7.

Robin
A mute and extremely skilled archer of the Temple Mercenaries. He became close friends with Ares,Baroona,Douglas and Gogh.

He was killed in battle after wounding Mikael with an arrow and saving Icarus. His actions forced Mikael's troops to withdraw to heal Mikael.

Chronos
Chronos is the central nation in the geography of this story. Despite past conflict, it had enjoyed ten years of relative peace. However, the country's strength waned with the sanity and judgment of its king.

Ariadne
The love interest for Ares. She is the daughter of Lord Gizelle and innocent of the world. She follows Ares into the battle at Minos, taking for simple truth his statement that fighting was "fun". He saved her many times and diverted her from witnessing the worst of the battle. After Ares was wounded, Ariadne treated him. When Minos' assassins came and tried to take her and Helena away to Darrak to be sold as slaves, Ares saved them, but Ariadne called him a savage and left him (due to how brutally he killed everyone). Helena chastised her for that, and Ariadne returned and remains his girlfriend.

Ariadne was targeted by Mikael and his Death Knights in an effort to kidnap her. When in all reality, Mikael wanted to keep her safe from the war.

Ariadne first appears in Chapter 19.

Antonis
Antonis is an admiral in Chronos' army. He assassinates the king of Chronos and tries to have Icarus assassinated also. He takes over the country for a brief period of time, during the civil war.

During a meeting with Daarak for an alliance against Icarus, he was killed by Cygnus.

Antonis first appears in Chapter 21.

Carnival
Carnival was previously an A-Rank soldier for the Temple Mercenaries and their top fighter. He was known to be merciless and was kicked out for killing a comrade over a trivial matter. He was nicknamed "Bloodmaster". Carnival uses two swords and a manic fighting style that reflects his savage nature. Carnival joins an ex-general of Chronos, Shion, and creates with him a bandit group. Carnival meets with the Temple Mercenaries again when they are hired to destroy the bandit group. Carnival nearly kills One-Arm Jack when he is stopped by Mikael who fights with him while the rest of the Temple Mercenaries go onward to fight Shion. Carnival is narrowly defeated by Michael who spares his life causing Carnival to be in Michael's debt while at the same revering him.

Carnival is later recruited by Michael to be part his personal guard, and is killed by Baroona.

Carnival first appears in Chapter 7.

Genasis
Icarus' right-hand man.

Genesis was considered unworthy at his dojo but Icarus notes him and decides to make him his underling although it shocks the other students and master. Genesis claims that he will do what his master wants him to do: if Icarus says to win he will, and if he says to lose, he will. Genesis is killed by one of the Death Knight’s leaders. Mikael then sends his head to Icarus to unnerve him. Genesis has great skill in swordsmanship and is even respected by Carnival. He is defeated by the two Death Knight leaders, Sandra/Ray/Rei, Carnival, and Esteban when he was trying to kill Mikael.

Genesis first appears in Chapter 21.

Gizelle
Ariadne's father. He is a nobleman who supports Icarus during the civil war.

Helena
Helena is the acknowledged strongest fighter in the port city of Nix and the bodyguard of the Lord Gizelle's daughter, Ariadne. She is initially hostile to Ares and thinks he is a bad influence on Ariadne. When Ariadne stowed away with the soldiers headed to Minos, she realized immediately and set off to rescue her. She warmed to Ares after he protected her and Ariadne from assassins during the invasion of Minos.  She has a glare that can discourage most men to approach Ariadne.

Helena first appears in Chapter 19.

Icarus
Icarus was a young general who became the youngest king of Chronos. He first commissioned Temple Mercenaries to help with the pre-emptive invasion of Minos. He hired Mikael, Baroona, Ares, and Gogh as a personal escort for the preliminary talks with the Radnik Alliance. He again hired Temple Mercenaries to assist with the civil war in Chronos after the previous king was assassinated and with the war with the Radnik Alliance shortly afterwards. After the Civil War, the former king's advisors offered him the kingship.

Icarus is a calm, thoughtful man, respected and loved by his soldiers. His skill lies with military strategy more than battle, but he fights competently when needed. He also has a good eye for ability, selecting his right-hand man, Genesis, despite that man's bad reputation.  He is also a notorious smoker, which he can't give up because of all of the trouble that he has do deal with.

Icarus first appears in Chapter 19.

Kiron
Kiron is the Master Swordsman of Chronos. After much battle prestige, Kiron chose a quiet retirement over a government post. By chance he saved the child Ares from an assassin and raised him. During their six years together as master and apprentice, he imparted his skills to the boy as his eyesight slowly failed. They lived quietly until Kirberos, the Red-Eyed Swordsman, tracked them down. Kiron fought well until Kirberos used Ares as bait to lure the now completely blind Master Swordsman into a wooded copse whose layout he did not know as well as his own property. Kirberos killed Kiron and added Kiron's sword to his collection. Ares vowed to not return to his master's grave until he had defeated the Red-Eyed Swordsman.

The late Master Swordsman of Chronos was also known as the Swordsman of the Wind for the sound made by his blade as he fought.

Kiron first appears in Chapter 5.

Mickey
A boy who lives in Jagsen village. Shion's bandits killed his parents when they raided his village. He antagonizes then supports Ares and his group, and promises to join the Temple Mercaneries when he becomes older. in the last chapter of Ares he is seen joining the new temple mercenaries to keep his promise with Ares.

Mickey first appears in Chapter 4.

Shion
Previously a General of Chronos, Shion goes off to become a bandit lord. Shion uses a giant sword to fight that crushes and slices through most other weapons. The sheath alone weighs 30 kg. Despite the size and weight of his blade "Ionix", Shion moves extremely fast. Shion will fight with his sword sheathed until he finds an opponent that he considers worthy of his blade. Shion leads a bandit group that terrorizes a nearby town. Shion's group is eventually decimated by the Temple Mercenaries who were hired by the town to defend them. While Michael fights Carnival Shion crushes many Temple Mercenaries eventually meeting his match when Ares appears. Shion begins with the upper hand in battle against Ares but ends up succumbing to Ares' incredible strength. Shion tells Ares that he is born a hero and requests that his men be spared. Ares agrees and with that slices Shion's throat.

Shion first appears in Chapter 5.

Pig
A large man and a leader in Shion's group of bandits. His soldiers comment that he would steal their food but was otherwise a good commanding officer. Ares kills him when Temple Mercenaries invade the bandits' headquarters.

Pig first appears in Chapter 11.

Daraak

Cygnus 
Cygnus is the son of a deceased Daraakian general whose family fell from nobility to lower class. He loves a girl named Sara. He fought with great skill to protect her from the Black Knights, but their leader threatened her safety if he did not join them. He is defeated by Ares during the war with the Radnik Alliance. Ares spares his life when he discovers that Cygnus also has a girl waiting for him. However, Mikael murders the defenseless, exhausted Cygnus after Ares leaves him. He was about 19 years old at the time of his death.

Cygnus displays pacifist behavior early into his story, but he is very protective of Sara. His father was killed in a war with Chronos, and his late mother raised him to hate all Chronosians. He still has nightmares about her and may be mentally unstable because of that.

Cygnus fights with a spear inherited from his father. His skill is such that 10 captains of the Black Knights had to subdue him after he killed 150 regular soldiers from the 6th Regiment. He is called The Black Swan under the Black Knights army because his movements are like a swan. He leaps high and is noted to be acrobatic.

Sara
Girlfriend of Cygnus. She and Cygnus work for the same eatery. The Black Knights held her life hostage to force Cygnus to fight for them.

Isiris

Mikael Graccio
Mikael is heir to the throne of Isiris. He is 18 years old. Mikael journeys to Chronos to fight with Temple Mercenaries and to experience the life of commoners. He is often seen with a leaf in his mouth. After the war with the Radnik Alliance, he receives intelligence of his father's failing health and his uncle's rebellion. He resigns his commission to return to his royal duties. After vanquishing his uncle, he decides to take Chronos for his own. During his time in Chronos, he'd ordered an elite army of children to be trained under the tutelage of Carnival, an ex-Temple Mercenary he defeated in an early battle.

Mikael is intelligent, well-educated, and well-versed in military strategy. He is anti-social and considerate to only his closest friends. Like Ares and Baroona, he overlooks the cowardice of Gogh. He gave a spoil to Ares for his girlfriend, and he vowed to help Ares defeat the Red-Eyed Swordsman. He also exhibits considerable bloodlust, which has put him at odds with his comrades. For example, he killed enemy soldiers who have surrendered and allies with battle wounds asking for help. He also killed the exhausted, weaponless Cygnus after Ares had spared his life.

Mikael is promoted to B-Rank after his first mission and A-Rank after the invasion of Minos. His victory over a hero of Minos caught the attention of Icarus during its invasion. He is a very strong fighter and typically fights with a sword. He, Ares, Baroona and Gogh belonged to Temple Mercenaries, 4th Regiment, 2nd Squadron, Troop 3.

Mikael first appears in Chapter 1.

While Isiris invaded Chronos, however, Mikeal dreaded every second of it, especially the attack on Temple Mercenaries Headquarters.  He delayed the attacks on the headquarters until he knew Ares, Robin, Baroona, and Gohu at least would survive.  He treasured all of the memories he had during the time he was in Chronos and his final words was that he was glad to have at least died at the hands of his best friend Ares, who misunderstood Mikeal's true intentions.

Kaiser
Silver Wolf Kaiser was Mikael’s master. He is an old man who lives with his grand daughter. He acts senile but is actually very sharp witted and skillful with his sword.

He is first introduced after Icarus’ defeat against Mikael at Hakuna.Mikael takes Kaiser's granddaughter hostage in order to blackmail him into assassinating Icarus. By this time, Icarus has recruited Ares,Baruna and Douglas as bodyguards, so Kaiser ends up fighting the three and being killed by Ares.

When he was younger he fought with Kiron. He defeats Kiron after several hours of fighting, but doesn't kill him. As he leaves, he tells Kiron not to waste the life that he has spared.

Sandra
One of the leaders of the Death Knights that serves under Mikael. One of two, the other being Nikolai, who knows of Mikael's real intention towards Ares, Baroona, Gogh, and Robin.

She went under the alias of Jill when taking care of Ares' PTSD after the Youth Brigade and the Death Knights slaughtered the Temple Mercenaries. Gogh developed a slight crush on her. She gave Ares and Gogh Mikael's plans for keeping Ariadne and Ares out of the war, but Gogh lost it when bandits attacked.

She's very skilled in battle, using a claw attached to a chain, like Baroona. She was the first one to hit Robin when he hit Mikael with an arrow, and she eventually killed him.

She was the last one to die when she tried to defend Mikaels dead body, being killed by Rikion.

Minos

No-Name Knights
An elite group of knights serving the Kingdom of Minos.They were eliminated during an ambush battle with the Temple Mercenaries during the Minos Invasion Arc.

Red-Eyed Clan
Members of the Red-Eyed Clan have a natural fighting ability that exceeds that of normal men. They tried to live a pacifist life and declined to fight for a king. That king aggressively exterminated them directly and by offering bounties.

Kirberos
Kirberos is the Red-Eyed Swordsman. He is infamous for killing other swordsmen and collecting their swords. He killed the Master Swordsman Kiron after Kiron had gone blind and took the right eye of his young apprentice, Ares. Although he is of mixed blood, his eyes are a "purer" red than full-blooded Red-Eyes. He is younger brother to the captain of the Black Knights, but he refuses to acknowledge his "weak" older brother.

Kirberos fighting ability is so fearsome that none will claim bounty on him. The weapons of those he defeats he wears on his person and switches them out during battle.

He currently has six swords in Chapter 204. The first two are swords that he uses at the same time, he is ambidextrous, are swords of high quality but are not unique in any other way. The second pair are sword, he ties together to form a weapon like Baroona’s. The wire is not as strong as Baroona’s wire based on the fact that Ares easily cuts through it. However the swords are so sharp they can also easily cut through Baroonas wire, although previous characters have failed to. His fifth sword is a bendy sword that he used to take Kiron’s left eye. Ares nicknames it the Squid/Tentacle sword. It is used in the way that when a swordsman tries to block it with a sword, it will curve around the sword and stab them. It can be blocked by a long weapon, Ares counters it with a house lamp. The final sword, not yet shown in action is Ares' master’s sword. It was the most recent sword that the Red-Eyed swordsman has gained.  He is killed by Ares.

Kirberos first appears in Chapter 15.

Nicolai
Nicolai is one of Mikael's closest guards. When Mikael sends his other elite guards including Carnival away, Nicolai and Sandra/Ray are told of Mikaels real plan. Nicolai has red eyes and fights with a light scythe. He is killed by Ares on a mission to kidnap Ares' girlfriend.

Nicolai's real intentions however were to move Ariadne and Helena away so they wouldn't get hurt by the war.

Silonica

Rikion
Rikion is a young general from Silonica. He has a dark Mohawk and gold hoop earrings.  His brash, provocative temperament puts him at odds with the Temple Mercenaries and Genesis, although Icarus tends to overlook this. Rikion's attempts to fight strong enemies are often usurped by Ares, Mikael and Baroona to comedic effect. He is, however,a very skilled and capable fighter.

His troops respect him very much. They are very loyal to him, even turning around in the middle of a retreat to go back and rescue him, although sometimes they just cheer Rikion on without joining the fight themselves, much to his annoyance and disappointment. Rikion uses a weapon slightly similar to Baroona's, a sword connected to a chain. He appears to be 17–19 years old.

Rikion first appears in Chapter 22.

References

Ares